Xylobands are wristbands that contain light-emitting diodes and radio frequency receivers, they were launched by RB Concepts Ltd, a company set up by entrepreneur Clive Banks with inventor Jason Regler. The lights inside the wristband can be controlled by a software program, which sends signals to the wristband, instructing it to light up or blink, for example. The single colour version is available in green, blue, yellow, red, pink, and white.  The first use of Xylobands on a large scale was on Coldplay's 2012 Mylo Xyloto tour. A Xyloband was given to each member of the audience, and as the concert played, the flashing of the wristbands was synchronized to the music. The inventor of the wristbands, Jason Regler, stated that he had the idea for the product while at a Coldplay concert, during the song "Fix You".

Technology
The wristbands themselves are constructed of a thick fabric with LEDs inside the fabric. A radio receiver is located within a plastic case on the band, and it receives wireless signals from a controller. These signals are sent either by a handheld TV remote styled controller, which has a range of 250 meters, or a controller which is hosted on a laptop computer linked to a radio transmitter, which can remotely control the wristbands from up to 300 meters away.  The operator of the controller or laptop software may program all wristbands or only those of certain colors to flash on and off at specific intervals and specific moments. The wristbands are not intended to be lit outside of the concert venue, although there exist anecdotes of Xylobands "coming back to life" at seemingly random times.

Uses

The wristbands were given to each audience member at Coldplay's 2012 Mylo Xyloto tour. As the music played, the wristbands flashed with the music to create a colorful light show in the audience, which the Washington Post referred to as a "psychedelicatessen of moving, multicolored lights.". It was wrongly reported that Xylobands were costing the band approximately €490,000 per concert.  Xylobands were also prominently featured in Coldplay's "Charlie Brown" music video. The Santa Cruz-based electronic music event promotion company VitalSC offered Xylobands as part of a VIP package for their annual Dubstep music event, Wobbleland.

Xylobands were also used by Cisco Systems during their Cisco Live London 2013 event. They were given out to attendees to wear during a keynote presentation. Attendees to the conference were also given Xylobands when attending a party on the final evening of the conference. Video of the solutions keynote speech uploaded to YouTube includes references and brief footage of the wristbands.

It is uncertain whether or not Xylobands will be used by other organizations, such as sports teams. Regler and Coldplay currently have an agreement which governs the design trademark on the wristbands, the patent, and the intellectual property rights to the Xylobands. Regler also stated that the band would not want the Xyloband experience diluted, and that it remained to be seen if they would be marketed to other organizations. Yet, Xylobands' website beckons prospective customers to "put your brand on a Xyloband!"

In early October 2013, and then again in 2015, the Chicago Blackhawks used Xylobands as a part of their banner raising ceremony to celebrate their recent Stanley Cup wins. They were also used in a concert in Abu Dhabi on 31 October 2013 while Al Gasmy, and Amr Diab where performing. It was a promotion to the telecom operator DU in UAE
Also used during the Jay Z concert in Abu Dhabi on 1 November 2013 by DU. Audience members began throwing their lit wristbands into the air and over the heads of the crowd which, although unintended, created a fascinating visual display similar to fireless fireworks.

On 29 October 2014, Xylobands were given to each fan in attendance for the New York Knicks vs. Chicago Bulls at Madison Square Garden. The Xylobands were used during introductions during a short performance by the Blue Man Group. In April 2015, the New York Rangers used Xylobands as part of their pregame ceremony in the first round of the 2015 Stanley Cup Playoffs versus the Pittsburgh Penguins. Four months later, a video was posted on the Xyloband YouTube page showing iPad controlling and the wristbands flashing in different colors.

The Xylobands were also used in April 2016, as a 'concert element' during an on-stage music recording for the closure of Michael McIntyre's 'Big Show'. In June, the wristbands were present during the opening session of the #smaccDUB conference in Dublin, Ireland and during Coldplay's headline performance on the Pyramid Stage at Glastonbury Festival 2016, the band also partnered with Jason Regler for the A Head Full of Dreams Tour. The Cancer Research UK Shine Walk (25/26 September 2016) gave away Xylobands to its entrants, with the fundraising walk being a half or full marathon through the streets of London overnight. The wristbands fit with the theme of the event, which was to "shine" by wearing LEDs, EL wire, glow sticks, and so on to light up the night. They were plain white and were set to light up at strategic points, such as mile markers, pit stops and other important points.

Gallery

References

External links 
 Xylobands.com

Products introduced in 2011
Coldplay